This is a list of educational institutes in Majuli, a fluvial island in the Brahmaputra River in the Indian state of Assam.

Universities
Majuli University of Culture

Colleges
Majuli College
Jengraimukh College
Pub Majuli College
Garamur Pitamberdev College

Junior Colleges
Island Academy, Kamalabari

Schools
Auniati High School
Majuli Auniati Hemchandra High School
Keshab Ram Borah High School
Sri Lohit High School
Karatipar High School
Vivekananda Kendra Vidyalaya, Majuli
St. Paul's School, Majuli
Jengraimukh Higher Secondary School
Madhya Majuli Parijat Higher Secondary School
Pitambar dev higher Secondary School
Island Academy, Kamalabari

L P Schools
17 No. Bechamora L P School
65 No. Balichapori L.P. School
82 No. Borgoyan No. 2 L.P. School
19 No Baghar Gaon Primary School

Computer institutes 
 CEC Majuli, Garamur, Majuli
 CEC Pub Majuli, opp. Pub Majuli College, Bongaon
 CEC Phulani, near Phulani Outpost, Phulani
 ICE Majuli, Bongaon
 NEDS
 Nielit Majuli Study Centre, Garmur

See also
List of villages in Majuli
Bortani Gaon

Majuli
Assam-related lists